The Olympus PEN E-PL7 is a rangefinder-styled digital mirrorless interchangeable lens camera announced by Olympus Corp. on August 28, 2014. It succeeds the Olympus PEN E-PL6. The E-PL7 was succeeded by the Olympus PEN E-PL8 that was announced on September 19, 2016.

Differences between E-PL7 and E-PL6/5
 Flip down "selfie" capacitative touchscreen 
 Touch screen UI is available in most of the UI, including focus point selection, focus magnification, tap to focus/capture etc.
 Screen resolution changed from 460K dots to 1037K dots /480*320 to 720*480
 Newer AF system with 81 points instead of 35, practically giving it the same contrast detection system like in the more professional choices in the lineup, but lacks a phase-detection system. 
 Manual focusing is assisted by focus peaking, which enables easy focusing with any manual lens.
 Comprehensive Wi-Fi feature, which enables communication with any Wi-Fi capable web device, and allows complete control over camera features when used with Android or iOS and a relevant app.
 Geo-tagging pictures when captured through the O.I share app

References

External links
http://www.dpreview.com/products/olympus/slrs/oly_epl7/specifications

Cameras introduced in 2014
PEN E-PL7
Live-preview digital cameras